The 1973 Arizona Wildcats football team represented the University of Arizona during the 1973 NCAA Division I football season. Led by Jim Young in his first year, the Wildcats shared the Western Athletic Conference (WAC) championship with rival Arizona State, with ASU winning the head-to-head matchup to clinch the conference’s bowl bid and Arizona was left out of the postseason as a result.

Young was brought in by Arizona to replace Bob Weber, who was fired after the 1972 season. The Wildcats believed that Young would rebuild the team and to return them to their winning ways.

Schedule

Roster
Bill Adamson, mg
Dennis Anderson, s
Mike Battles, s
Theo Bell, wr
Jay Bledsoe, og
Wally Brumfield, de
Mike Dawson, dt
Obra Erby, lb
Charlie Gorham, k
Glen Gresham, lb
Rich Hall, dt
Willie Hamilton, rb
Keith Hartwig, wr
Allyn Haynes, og
Bruce Hill, qb
Mitch Hoopes, p
Dan Howard, te
Leon Lawrence, db
Rex Naumetz, de
Brian Murray, ot
Mark Neal, wr
Jim O'Connor, ot
Vince Phason, cb
Ransom Terrell, lb
Jim Upchurch, rb
Bruce Walker, dt
Roussell Williams, cb
Bob Windisch, c

Staff
 Head coach: Jim Young
 Offensive coaches: Bill Belknap, Bob Bockrath, John Mackovic, Willie Peete
 Defensive coaches: Mike Hankwitz, Sharkey Price (DL), Tom Reed, Larry Smith

Statistics

Passing

Rushing

Receiving

Awards

All-WAC (1st Team)
Jim O'Connor
Willie Hamilton
Roussell Williams
Ransom Terrell
Wally Brumfield

WAC Rookie of the Year: Bruce Hill

WAC Coach of the Year: Jim Young

Season notes
Despite sharing the WAC title, Arizona did not earn a bowl invitation due to its loss to Arizona State and a lack of bowl spots available at the time. The head-to-head loss to ASU was a major reason behind the Wildcats being uninvited for a bowl. Had they beaten ASU and won the WAC outright, the Wildcats would have earned a spot in the Fiesta Bowl.

Three of Arizona’s coaching staff would become future Wildcat head coaches. Larry Smith (defensive coordinator) would have a successful tenure with the Wildcats that began in 1980, and John Mackovic (offensive coordinator) was hired in 2001 and his Wildcat tenure would turn out to be a failure. A third coach, Mike Hankwitz, replaced Mackovic as Arizona’s coach during a disastrous 2003 season.

Many Wildcats fans as well as the Tucson community credited Young for turning the program around after his predecessor’s failed tenure with the team. Young would be awarded the WAC coach of the year for his efforts.

References

Arizona
Arizona Wildcats football seasons
Western Athletic Conference football champion seasons
Arizona Wildcats football